Gimmie Trouble is the second album released by the Detroit, Michigan electronic duo ADULT. in 2005.

For this album, they added a new guitarist to the line-up, Sam Consiglio.  He would leave the band early into 2006.

Track listing
 "Gimmie Trouble" (Nicola Kuperus, Adam Lee Miller) – 3:59
 "Bad Ideas" (Sam Consiglio, Kuperus, Miller) – 2:58
 "Scare Up the Birds" (Kuperus, Miller) – 3:30
 "Thought I Choked" (Consiglio, Kuperus, Miller) – 3:31
 "Stranger Mistake" (Kuperus, Miller) – 3:28
 "Disappoint the Youth" (Consiglio, Kuperus, Miller) – 4:03
 "In My Nerves" (Kuperus, Miller) – 3:32
 "Turn into Fever" (Consiglio, Kuperus, Miller) – 2:35
 "Helen Bach" – 3:18
 "Still Waiting" (Consiglio, Kuperus, Miller) – 2:28
 "Lovely Love" (Consiglio, Kuperus, Miller) – 2:40
 "Seal Me In" (Consiglio, Kuperus, Miller) – 2:41

External links
[ Gimmie Trouble] at Allmusic
Gimmie Trouble at Official ADULT. Site

2005 albums
Adult (band) albums
Thrill Jockey albums